Plesiophatus inarmigerus is a moth of the  family Palaephatidae. It was described by Donald R. Davis in 1986. It is found in the Andean lake region of Argentina and a somewhat disjunct site near the Chilean coast.

The length of the forewings is about 6 mm for males and 6-6.5 mm for females. Adults have dark fuscous forewings and light gray hindwings. They are on wing in February in one generation per year.

Etymology
The specific name is derived from Latin inarmiger (meaning unarmed) and refers to the relatively simple male genitalia.

References

Moths described in 1986
Palaephatidae
Moths of South America
Taxa named by Donald R. Davis (entomologist)